This is a list of Italian television related events from 2011.

Events
4 February - Viacom (the American company that owns Nickelodeon) becomes a co-owner of the Italian television studio Rainbow S.p.A. after purchasing a 30% stake.
18 April - Andrea Cocco wins the eleventh season of Grande Fratello.
30 April - Il Commissario Rex actor Kaspar Capparoni and his partner Yulia Musikhina win the seventh season of Ballando con le stelle.
11 June - 48-year-old painter Fabrizio Vendramin wins the second season of Italia's Got Talent.

Debuts

International
29 August - / My Little Pony: Friendship is Magic (Italia 1) (2010–present)
19 October - / The Octonauts (Disney Junior) (2010–present)

Television shows

RAI

Drama 

 Atelier Fontana, le sorelle della moda (Fashion sisters) – biopic by Riccardo Milani, with Alessandra Mastonardi, Anna Valle and Federica De Cola as Micol, Zoe and Giovanna Fontana; 2 episodes.
Tiberio Mitri, il campione e la miss (The champ and the miss) - biopic by Angelo Longoni, with Luca Argentero in the title role and Martina Stella as Fulvia Franco; 2 episodes. The airing of the movie is delayed of six months, for a lawsuit by the Mitri’s family.

Miniseries 

 Il segreto dell’acqua (The secret of the water) – by Renato De Maria, with Riccardo Scamarcio and Valentina Lodovini; 6 episodes. An edgy policeman investigates the Mafia traffic of drinking water in Palermo, in which his family too is involved.

News and educational 

 La mala del Brenta, la vera storia (Mala del Brenta, the true story) – documentary by Nicola Prosatore, two episodes.
Tutta un’altra storia (Another story at all) – care of Andrea Camilleri. Eight famous writers, from Camilleri himself to Giancarlo De Cataldo tells the history of Italy since 1861.
Sostiene Bollani (Bollani Maintains) – mix of variety and educational program about music, both classic and popular, hosted by the pianist Stefano Bollani, with Caterina Guzzanti as constant guest; two seasons.

2000s
Grande Fratello (2000–present)
Ballando con le stelle (2005–present)
X Factor (2008–present)

2010s
Italia's Got Talent (2010–present)

Ending this year

Births

Deaths

See also
2011 in Italy
List of Italian films of 2011

References